The University of Florida Fredric G. Levin College of Law (UF Law) is the law school of the University of Florida located in Gainesville, Florida. Founded in 1909, it is the oldest operating public law school in Florida, and second oldest overall in the state.

For every entering class in its three-year J.D. program, the law school has approximately 200 students. The first-year class is broken into three sections of approximately 50-70 students, who take most first-year classes together. UF Law's  reputation and prestige in the state of Florida have led the school to produce several prominent alumni in Florida's state judiciary, government, media and business as well as throughout the United States.

Per U.S. News & World Report, UF Law is the 6th-highest public law school, and the highest-ranked law school in Florida.

Academics

The Levin College of Law offers a three-year, full-time program leading to a Juris Doctor (J.D.) degree. It also offers advanced law degrees, including Master of Laws (LL.M.) degree programs in taxation, international taxation, U.S. law, land use, and environmental law, in addition to a Doctor of Juridical Science (S.J.D.) in taxation.

According to the 2022 U.S. News & World Report law school rankings, the Levin College of Law ranks 21st overall among American law schools and 6th among public law schools. It places second in tax law among all law schools and first among public law schools. The U.S. News & World Report ranks the Levin College of Law as the best law school in the state of Florida.

Its 2020 entering class consists of 208 students, and has a median undergraduate GPA of 3.84 and a median Law School Admission Test (LSAT) score of 165. Its 25th/75th percentile LSAT scores and GPA were 156/166 and 3.52/3.94, respectively. 33% of the incoming class are racially or ethnically diverse students, and 50% are women. The college currently only offers admission for the fall semester.

Required first-year courses are torts, criminal law, contracts, legal research and writing, constitutional law, civil procedure, property, introduction to lawyering, and appellate advocacy. Students are also required to take legal drafting and are recommended to take courses in evidence, estates and trusts, corporations, and trial practice.

Students can choose to pursue their J.D. in conjunction with another graduate degree, including a master's degree, Doctor of Philosophy (Ph.D), or Doctor of Medicine (M.D.) in one of the university's dual-degree programs. Students can also complete specific requirements in addition to those required for the J.D. and earn a certificate indicating specialization in estate planning and trusts, family law, criminal law, intellectual property law, environmental and land use law, or U.S. law.

The College offers nine-month programs leading to the LL.M. degree in taxation or international taxation as well as in U.S. law, land use, and environmental law. The LL.M. in international taxation is open to graduates of both U.S. and foreign law schools. The College of Law also offers an S.J.D in taxation.

The Levin College of Law hosts six university-wide academic centers. In 1988, Law School professors Sharon Rush and Kenneth Nunn founded the Center for the Study of Race and Race Relations. Staff directors and professors from across the university advise the center and collaborate with law professors to research the intersection of race and the law. The Levin College of Law also hosts the Center for Government Responsibility, the state's oldest legal and public policy research institute. Former dean and emeritus professor Jon Mills founded the center in 1972 to study Richard Nixon's cut in funding to public housing and civil rights programs. The Levin College of Law also hosts centers on Criminal Justice, Children and Families, and Estate Planning.

History

The College of Law was founded in 1909. It was first housed in Thomas Hall, and then in Bryan Hall from 1914 to 1969. 

The school excluded African Americans. Virgil D. Hawkins was denied admission because he was African American in 1948. He appealed to the Florida Supreme Court and then the U.S. Supreme Court for relief. The college finally desegregated in the wake of his fight on September 15, 1958 and admitted an African-American student, and its faculty was desegregated shortly thereafter. 

In 1969, the college moved to its current location in Holland Hall, which is named after the former Florida Governor, U.S. Senator, and alumnus Spessard L. Holland (LL.B. '16).  Holland Hall is located in the northwest section of the university's campus. In 1984, Bruton-Geer Hall, named after the parents of alumnus Judge James D. Bruton (LL.B. '33) and his wife Quintilla Geer Bruton, was added to the law school complex.

The College of Law was renamed the Levin College of Law in 1999 after prominent Pensacola trial lawyer and alumnus Fredric G. Levin (J.D. '61), who donated $10 million to the college, a sum that was matched by a $10 million grant from the state of Florida to create a $20 million endowment.

The College of Law underwent a major renovation between 2004 and 2005, creating new academic space and expanding the law library, which was named the Lawton Chiles Legal Information Center after the former Florida Governor, U.S. Senator, and alumnus Lawton Chiles (LL.B. '55).

In September 2012, Supreme Court Justice Clarence Thomas spoke at the College of Law.

A new courtroom facility was completed in 2009. The facility, which was made possible by an additional $2 million donation from the Levin family, is named the Martin Levin Advocacy Center in honor of UF Law alumnus Martin H. Levin (J.D. '88), and son of Fred Levin. The facility is 20,000 gross square feet, two stories tall, and includes a state of the art courtroom. The new courtroom is designed to incorporate new technology to allow students to understand the role of technology in modern practice. Construction began on the second phase of the building (the second floor) in the Fall 2010 and was completed in Fall 2011. The second floor includes offices and meeting/seminar rooms.

Employment 
According to University of Florida's official 2019 ABA-required disclosures: 80.6% of the Class of 2018 obtained full-time, long-term JD-required bar-passage required employment nine months after graduation. In addition, 7.5% obtained full-time, long-term employment where a J.D. is an advantage; 3.75% enrolled in graduate degree programs (predominantly in UF’s LL.M. program, which is ranked third in the country by U.S. News & World Report); and 0.9% had their employment start date deferred or were unknown or not seeking employment. University of Florida's Law School Transparency under-employment score is 10.9%, indicating the percentage of the Class of 2018 unemployed, pursuing an additional degree (a large number of UF Law graduates pursue LL.M. degrees), or working in a non-professional, short-term, or part-time job nine months after graduation.

According to UF Law's official disclosures to the American Bar Association, nearly 85% of the Class of 2019 successfully obtained employment as attorneys licensed to practice law.

Costs
The 2019-20 semester per credit hour tuition/fee for continuing law students who matriculated prior to fall 2018, is $743.31 (30 hours = $22,299.30) for Florida residents and $1,296.80 (30 hours = $38,904.00) for non-residents. The 2019-20 semester per credit hour tuition/fee for students who matriculated in fall 2018 and beyond will be part of the block tuition system. The rates are $21,803.76 for Florida residents and $38,039.47 for non-residents.

Notable alumni

The Fredric G. Levin College of Law has produced numerous United States Senators, fifteen members of the United States House of Representatives, a plethora of state governors, and a couple of United States Ambassadors. In the past forty years, four presidents of the American Bar Association were graduates of the college, more than any other law school for that time period. Since 1950, over sixty percent of Florida Bar Association presidents were graduates of the college. Numerous alumni have served as judges on the federal bench, and five have even served on the United States Court of Appeals. Seventeen graduates have served on the Florida Supreme Court, fifteen of them as chief justice. Eleven graduates have served as presidents of a college or university.

Extracurricular activities
The College of Law has over 40 active student organizations, including:
Organizations devoted to interest in a specific area of law (art law, criminal law, military law, business law, public interest law, tax law, immigration law, real estate law, etc.)
Political and social organizations (Law School Democrats, Law College Republicans, National Lawyers Guild, American Constitution Society)
The Federalist Society at the College of Law is considered one of the preeminent chapters in the nation. The chapter hosted the Federalist Society's 33rd Annual National Student Symposium in Spring 2014.
The John Marshall Bar Association  (JMBA) was founded in 1909, and is one of the oldest organizations at the University of Florida.
The Board
Community service organizations for law students to use their legal skills to help the community (Volunteer Income Tax Assistance)
Organization for students with a common background (Asian-Pacific American Law Student Association, Hispanic and Latino/Latina Law Student Association, Black Law Students Association, Jewish Law Students Association, Christian Legal Society, St. Thomas More Society, Lambda Legal, Law Association for Women, Spanish-American Law Students Association).

The College of Law has a mock trial team, which competes nationally. Additionally, it has six moot court teams:
 The Florida Moot Court Team, governed by the Justice Campbell Thornal Executive Board. It competes every semester in state, regional, national, and intramural competitions.
The Tax Moot Court Team, which competes annually in multiple LL.M. and J.D.  national and international Tax Moot Court Competitions.
The Jessup Moot Court Team, participating in international law competitions
The International Commercial Arbitration Moot Court Team, competing in international arbitration
The Corporate & Securities Moot Court Team, which focuses on securities regulation, corporate governance, and fiduciary duties in business law.
The Environmental Moot Court Team, which competes annual at the National Environmental Law Moot Court Competition at Pace Law School.

The College of Law publishes the following law reviews:
The Florida Law Review, the university's flagship publication
The University of Florida Journal of Law & Public Policy
The Florida Journal of International Law
The Journal of Technology Law and Policy
The Florida Tax Review

Campus
The architectural style of Bruton-Geer Hall, completed in 1984, is best classified as brutalism; concrete features prominently in its design. The renovation of Holland Hall was completed in 2005 at the cost of $25 million and features brick and concrete.

The grounds of the College of Law contain several pieces of artwork. The newest additions are three metal sculptures by Jim Cole of the Rhode Island School of Design representing the three branches of government: The Legislative and The Executive (installed 2005) and The Judiciary (installed 2006). These sculptures also function as benches. The lobby of the law school library contains a sculpture made by Cole in the form of a chair entitled The Lobbyist.

Also contained on the grounds of the college are a series of large, intertwined metal rings, which have the appearance of being partially underground. They are known as "the Cheerios."

Deans

Images

References

External links
 

Colleges of the University of Florida
Educational institutions established in 1909
ABA-accredited law schools in Florida
1909 establishments in Florida